This is a list of rural localities in Amur Oblast. Amur Oblast is a federal subject of Russia (an oblast), located on the banks of the Amur and Zeya Rivers in the Russian Far East. The administrative center of the oblast, is the city of Blagoveshchensk. As of the 2010 Census, the oblast's population was 830,103.

Arkharinsky District 
Rural localities in Arkharinsky District:

 Antonovka
 Arkadyevka
 Boguchan
 Bon
 Chernigovka
 Chernoberyozovka
 Domikan
 Domikan
 Gribovka
 Gulikovka
 Innokentyevka
 Kamenka
 Kamenny Karyer
 Kasatkino
 Kazachy
 Kazanovka
 Krasnaya Gorka
 Krasny Istok
 Krasny Luch
 Kulustay
 Kundur
 Leninskoye
 Levy Bereg
 Mikhaylovka
 Mogilyovka
 Novodomikan
 Novopokrovka
 Novosergeyevka
 Novospassk
 Orlovka
 Otvazhnoye
 Petropavlovka
 Rachi
 Sagibovo
 Severnoye
 Svobodnoye
 Tatakan
 Uril
 Volnoye
 Yadrino
 Yerakhta
 Yesaulovka
 Zarechnoye
 Zhuravli
 Zhuravlyovka

Belogorsky District 
Rural localities in Belogorsky District:

 Amurskoye
 Belotserkovka
 Chernetcheno
 Dubrovka
 Kamyshevka
 Kiseleozyorka
 Klyuchi
 Komissarovka
 Krugloye
 Kustanayevka
 Lokhvitsy
 Lozovoye
 Lugovoye
 Lukyanovka
 Mezhdugranka
 Mirnoye
 Mostovoye
 Nekrasovka
 Nikolskoye
 Novoandreyevka
 Novonazarovka
 Novoselitba
 Novoye
 Ozeryane
 Pavlovka
 Polyanoye
 Prigorodnoye
 Savelyevka
 Svetilovka
 Tomichi
 Uspenovka
 Vasilyevka
 Velikoknyazevka
 Vozzhayevka
 Zakharyevka
 Zarechnoye

Blagoveshchensk Urban Okrug 
Rural localities in Blagoveshchensk Urban Okrug:

 Belogorye (station)
 Belogorye (village)
 Mukhinka
 Plodopitomnik
 Prizeyskaya
 Sadovoye

Blagoveshchensky District 
Rural localities in Blagoveshchensky District:

 Bibikovo
 Chigiri
 Dronovo
 Gribskoye
 Grodekovo
 Gryaznushka
 Ignatyevo
 Kanikurgan
 Kanton-Kommuna
 Markovo
 Mikhaylovka
 Natalyino
 Novinka
 Novopetrovka
 Novotroitskoye
 Peredovoye
 Pryadchino
 Rovnoye
 Sergeyevka
 Udobnoye
 Ust-Ivanovka
 Vadimovo
 Verkhneblagoveshchenskoye
 Vladimirovka
 Volkovo
 Yegoryevka
 Zarechny

Bureysky District 
Rural localities in Bureysky District:

 Alexeyevka
 Astashikha
 Bezozyornoye
 Bezymyannoye
 Doldykan
 Gomelevka
 Kivdo-Tyukan
 Malinovka
 Muravka
 Nikolayevka
 Pravaya Raychikha
 Rodionovka
 Semyonovka
 Staraya Raychikha
 Tryokhrechye
 Tyukan
 Uspenovka
 Ust-Kivda
 Vinogradovka

Ivanovsky District 
Rural localities in Ivanovsky District:

 Andreyevka
 Annovka
 Berezovka
 Bogorodskoye
 Bogoslovka
 Bolsheozyorka
 Cheremkhovo
 Cherkasovka
 Dmitriyevka
 Ivanovka
 Konstantinogradovka
 Kreshchenovka
 Lugovoye
 Nadezhdenskoye
 Nekrasovka
 Nikolayevka
 Novoalexeyevka
 Novopokrovka
 Petropavlovka
 Polevoye
 Pravovostochnoye
 Priozernoye
 Rakitnoye
 Sadovoye
 Semiozyorka
 Solnechnoye
 Srednebelaya
 Srednebeloye
 Troitskoye
 Uspenovka
 Vishnevka
 Voznesenovka
 Yerkovtsy

Konstantinovsky District 
Rural localities in Konstantinovsky District:

 Klyuchi
 Konstantinovka
 Kovrizhka
 Krestovozdvizhenka
 Nizhnaya Poltavka
 Novopetrovka
 Novotroitskoye
 Oktyabrskoye
 Orlovka
 Semidomka
 Srednyaya Poltavka
 Verkhny Urtuy
 Verkhnyaya Poltavka
 Voykovo
 Zenkovka
 Zolotonozhka

Magdagachinsky District 
Rural localities in Magdagachinsky District:

 Aprelsky
 Chalgany
 Chernyaevo
 Daktuy
 Gonzha
 Gudachi
 Kisly Klyuch
 Krasnaya Pad
 Kuznetsovo
 Pioner
 Sulus
 Tolbuzino
 Tygda
 Tymersol

Mazanovsky District 
Rural localities in Mazanovsky District:

 Abaykan
 Alexeyevka
 Antonovka
 Beloyarovo
 Bichura
 Bogoslovka
 Dmitriyevka
 Druzhnoye
 Ivanovsky
 Kamenka
 Kanichi
 Khristinovka
 Koltsovka
 Kozlovka
 Krasnoyarovo
 Leontyevka
 Margaritovka
 Maysky
 Mazanovo
 Mikhaylovka
 Molchanovo
 Novokiyevka
 Novokiyevsky Uval
 Novorossiyka
 Pautovka
 Petrovka
 Pionersky
 Popovka
 Praktichi
 Putyatino
 Razdolnoye
 Romankautsy
 Sapronovo
 Slava
 Sokhatino
 Taskino
 Uglovoye
 Ulma
 Yubileynoye

Mikhaylovsky District 
Rural localities in Mikhaylovsky District:

 Arsentyevka
 Cheremisino
 Chesnokovo
 Dim
 Dubovoye
 Kalinino
 Kavkaz
 Korshunovka
 Krasnaya Orlovka
 Krasny Vostok
 Krasny Yar
 Kupriyanovo
 Mikhaylovka
 Nizhnaya Ilyinovka
 Nizhnezavitinka
 Novochesnokovo
 Novogeorgiyevka
 Petropavlovka
 Poyarkovo
 Privolnoye
 Shadrino
 Shumilovka
 Shurino
 Vinnikovo
 Voskresenovka (station)
 Voskresenovka (village)
 Vysokoye
 Yaroslavka
 Zelyony Bor

Oktyabrsky District 
Rural localities in Oktyabrsky District:

 Belyakovka
 Borisoglebka
 Borisovo
 Cheremushki
 Georgiyevka
 Ilyinovka
 Kharkovka
 Koroli
 Kutilovo
 Maksimovka
 Maryanovka
 Mukhinsky
 Nagorny
 Nikolo-Alexandrovka
 Novomikhaylovka
 Panino
 Pereyaslovka
 Peschanoozerka
 Pokrovka
 Preobrazhenovka
 Pribrezhny
 Romanovka
 Sergeye-Fyodorovka
 Smeloye
 Smirnovka
 Troyebratka
 Trudovoy
 Uvalny
 Varvarovka
 Vostochny
 Yasnaya Polyana
 Yekaterinoslavka
 Yuzhny
 Zaozerny

Progress urban okrug 
Rural localities in Progress urban okrug:

 Kivdinsky

Raychikhinsk urban okrug 
Rural localities in Raychikhinsk urban okrug:

 Shiroky
 Ugolnoye
 Zelvino

Romnensky District 
Rural localities in Romnensky District:

 Amaranka
 Bratolyubovka
 Chergali
 Dalnevostochnoye
 Grigoryevka
 Kakhovka
 Kalinovka
 Klimovka
 Kokhlatskoye
 Kuzmichi
 Lyubimoye
 Morozovka
 Novonikolayevka
 Novorossiyka
 Novy Byt
 Pozdeyevka
 Pridorozhnoye
 Raygorodka
 Rogozovka
 Romny
 Seredinnoye
 Smolyanoye
 Svyatorussovka
 Urozhaynoye
 Verkhnebeloye
 Vostochnaya Niva
 Voznesenovka
 Vysokoye
 Znamenka

Selemdzhinsky District 
Rural localities in Selemdzhinsky District:

 Byssa
 Fevralskoye
 Isa
 Ivanovskoye
 Koboldo
 Norsk
 Ogodzha
 Olginsk
 Selemdzhinsk
 Stoyba
 Zlatoutovsk

Seryshevsky District 
Rural localities in Seryshevsky District:

 Arga
 Avtonomovka
 Belogorka
 Belonogovo
 Belousovka
 Birma
 Blizhny Sakhalin
 Bochkaryovka
 Bolshaya Sazanka
 Borispol
 Derzhavinka
 Dobryanka
 Frolovka
 Kazanka
 Khitrovka
 Klyuchiki
 Krasnaya Polyana
 Lebyazhye
 Lermontovo
 Limannoye
 Lipovka
 Milekhino
 Novookhochye
 Novosergeyevka
 Ozernoye
 Parunovka
 Pavlovka
 Polyana
 Rozhdestvenka
 Shiroky Log
 Sokolovka
 Sosnovka
 Sretenka
 Tavrichanka
 Tomskoye
 Udarnoye
 Ukraina
 Ukrainka
 Verkhneborovaya
 Vernoye
 Vesyoloye
 Vodorazdelnoye
 Voronzha
 Voskresenovka
 Vvedenovka

Shimanovsky District 
Rural localities in Shimanovsky District:

 Aktay
 Anosovo
 Bazisnoye
 Bereya
 Chagoyan
 Dzhatva
 Klyuchevoye
 Kukhterin Lug
 Malinovka
 Mukhino
 Novogeorgiyevka
 Novovoskresenovka
 Pereselenets
 Petrushi
 Petrushi
 Razdolnoye
 Saskal
 Seletkan
 Svetilnoye
 Svobodny Trud
 Uralovka
 Ushakovo

Skovorodinsky District 
Rural localities in Skovorodinsky District:

 Albazino
 Ayachi
 Bam
 Bolshaya Omutnaya
 Dzhalinda
 Gluboky
 Ignashino
 Itashino
 Lesnoy
 Madalan
 Never
 Oldoy
 Orochensky
 Osezhino
 Segachama
 Sgibeyevo
 Solnechny
 Srednereynovsky
 Takhtamygda
 Taldan
 Tayozhny
 Ulruchyi
 Ulyagir

Svobodnensky District 
Rural localities in Svobodnensky District:

 Bardagon
 Busse
 Buzuli
 Chembary
 Chernigovka
 Chernovka
 Dmitriyevka
 Gashchenka
 Glukhari
 Goluboye
 Guran
 Istochny
 Klimoutsy
 Kostyukovka
 Kurgan
 Malaya Sazanka
 Maly Ergel
 Markuchi
 Moskvitino
 Nizhniye Buzuli
 Novgorodka
 Novoivanovka
 Novonikolsk
 Novoostropol
 Novostepanovka
 Petropavlovka
 Podgorny
 Razlivnaya
 Rogachevka
 Semyonovka
 Serebryanka
 Sukromli
 Sychovka
 Talali
 Ust-Pyora
 Yukhta
 Yukhta-3
 Zagan
 Zagornaya Selitba
 Zheltoyarovo
 Zigovka

Tambovsky District 
Rural localities in Tambovsky District:

 Chuyevka
 Dukhovskoye
 Gilchin
 Korfovo
 Kositsino
 Kozmodemyanovka
 Krasnoye
 Kuropatino
 Lazarevka
 Lermontovka
 Limannoye
 Lipovka
 Lozovoye
 Muravyevka
 Orletskoye
 Pridorozhnoye
 Razdolnoye
 Rezunovka
 Roshchino
 Sadovoye
 Svobodka
 Tambovka
 Tolstovka
 Zharikovo

Tyndinsky District 
Rural localities in Tyndinsky District:

 Anosovsky
 Belenky
 Bugorki
 Chilchi
 Dipkun
 Khorogochi
 Kuvykta
 Lapri
 Larba
 Lopcha
 Marevy
 Mogot
 Murtygit
 Olyokma
 Pervomayskoye
 Solovyovsk
 Strelka
 Tutaul
 Urkan
 Ust'-Nyukzha
 Ust-Urkima
 Vostochny
 Yankan
 Yuktali

Zavitinsky District 
Rural localities in Zavitinsky District:

 Albazinka
 Antonovka
 Avramovka
 Bely Yar
 Boldyrevka
 Chervonaya Armiya
 Demyanovka
 Deya
 Fyodorovka
 Innokentyevka
 Ivanovka
 Kamyshenka
 Kupriyanovka
 Lenino
 Novoalexeyevka
 Platovo
 Podolovka
 Preobrazhenovka
 Uspenovka
 Valuyevo
 Verkhneilyinovka

Zeysky District 
Rural localities in Zeysky District:

 Alexandrovka
 Alexeyevka
 Algach
 Amuro-Baltiysk
 Beregovoy
 Berezovka
 Bomnak
 Chalbachi
 Dugda
 Gorny
 Gulik
 Ivanovka
 Khvoyny
 Kirovsky
 Nikolayevka
 Nikolayevka-2
 Ogoron
 Oktyabrsky
 Ovsyanka
 Polyakovsky
 Rublyovka
 Sian
 Snezhnogorsky
 Sosnovy Bor
 Tungala
 Umlekan
 Verkhnezeysk
 Yasny
 Yubileyny
 Zarechnaya Sloboda
 Zolotaya Gora

See also 
 
 Lists of rural localities in Russia

References 

Amur Oblast